Oxide & Neutrino Present: The Solid Sound of the Underground is a 2000 compilation album containing songs of the So Solid Crew and various other artists of the UK garage scene.

Track listing
 "Bound 4 da Reload" (Remix) - Oxide & Neutrino
 "Dangerous" - Same People
 "I Don't Smoke" (Nu Skool Rave Mix) - DJ Dee Kline
 "Oh No (Sentimental Things)" - So Solid Crew
 "Bring the Lights Down" - Mr. Reds & Kaliber
 "Rumble" - Kaos & The One Eyed Wonder
 "Life Is What You Make It" - Sidewinder
 "Neighbourhood" (Zed Bias vocal mix) - Zed Bias
 "Can You Feel It" - Mr. Reds
 "Buddah Finger" - Reservoir Dogs
 "Dilemma" - So Solid Crew
 "You're Mine" - Suburban Lick
 "Basslick" - Second Protocol
 "Terminator" - Oxide & Neutrino
 "Why" - So Solid Crew
 "Poison" - The Corrupted Cru
 "Bound 4 da Reload (Casualty)" - Oxide & Neutrino
 "How Much Gal" - The Corrupted Cru
 "Supergran" - DJ Oxide/DJ Big Kid

References

2000 compilation albums
Oxide & Neutrino albums